"Sr." is a 2022 American documentary film that examines the careers and relationship between Robert Downey Jr. and his father, Robert Downey Sr. The film, directed by Chris Smith, was released theatrically on November 18, 2022, and was released on Netflix on December 2.

Premise
Robert Downey Jr. recounts the life and career of his late father Robert Downey Sr.

Cast 
Robert Downey Jr.
Robert Downey Sr.
Paul Thomas Anderson
Alan Arkin
Mezi Atwood
Sean Hayes
Norman Lear
Lawrence Wolf

Release
"Sr." first premiered at the 2022 Telluride Film Festival in September.

"Sr." was released in selected theatres on November 18, 2022, before streaming on Netflix beginning December 2. The trailer of the film was released by Netflix on 14 November 2022.

Reception
 

Gary Goldstein of The Los Angeles Times wrote: "Sr. proves a tender portrait and fitting tribute to an offbeat hero and creative pioneer." Brian Tallerico of RogerEbert.com gave the film three out of four stars, stating that although the documentary "sometimes feels like it's playing tug-of-war between something one would watch in a film studies class and something one would watch in a psychology class", its approach makes it feel more personal.

The film won the National Board of Review Award for Best Documentary Feature.

References

External links 
 
 

American documentary films
2022 films
2022 documentary films
2020s English-language films
2020s American films
English-language Netflix original films
Netflix original documentary films
Films directed by Chris Smith